Akiodoris salacia is a species of sea slug, a dorid nudibranch, a shell-less marine gastropod mollusc in the family Onchidorididae.

Distribution
This species was described from 3 specimens collected at Tyee Point, Copper Cove, British Columbia .

References

Akiodorididae
Gastropods described in 2005